Thunderbox is the seventh studio album by English hard rock group Humble Pie, released in 1974. It reached number 52 on the US Billboard 200 album chart. The planned UK release was cancelled.

Background
Twelve songs appear, seven of them covers, including "Grooving With Jesus" originally released by The Violinaires; Ann Peebles song "I Can't Stand the Rain" once referred to by John Lennon as the perfect single; "Anna (Go to Him)" originally written and performed by Arthur Alexander and recorded by The Beatles on their first album; and "Oh La-De-Da" by The Staple Singers.

The word Thunderbox is a seventeenth century slang word for the toilet, which gives an example of Humble Pie's sense of humour. The cover shows a keyhole through which a woman can be seen sitting on a toilet.

Track listing
 "Thunderbox"  (Marriott, Clempson)	   	    	 
 "Groovin' with Jesus" (Gene Barge, Bennie Swartz)	  	  	
 "I Can't Stand the Rain" (Ann Peebles, Don Bryant, Bernard Miller)
 "Anna (Go to Him)" (Arthur Alexander) 	  	  	
 "No Way" (Marriott, Ridley)
 "Rally with Ali" (Marriott, Clempson, Ridley, Shirley) 	  	  	
 "Don't Worry, be Happy" (Marriott, Clempson, Ridley, Shirley)	  	  	
 "Ninety-Nine Pounds" (Don Bryant)	  	  	
 "Every Single Day"  (Clempson)	  	
 "No Money Down" (Chuck Berry)	  	  	
 "Drift Away" (Mentor Williams)	  	  	
 "Oh La-De-Da" (Phillip Mitchell)

Personnel
Humble Pie
 Steve Marriott – guitar, harmonica, keyboards, lead vocals
 Dave "Clem" Clempson – guitar, slide guitar, backing vocals
 Greg Ridley – bass, backing vocals; lead vocals on "Drift Away"
 Jerry Shirley – drums, backing vocals; piano on "I Can't Stand the Rain"

With guest: 
 Mel Collins – horns
Special thanks to The Blackberries:
Carlena Williams – vocals 
Venetta Fields – vocals 
Billie Barnum – vocals

Technical staff
 Hipgnosis – original album sleeve design
Arranged and produced by The Pie
Recorded at Olics Sound, somewhere east of Guatemala
Editing: Alan O'Duffy

Tour

References

External links
History of Humble Pie
Thunderbox track listing and album credits info.

1973 albums
Humble Pie (band) albums
Albums with cover art by Hipgnosis
Albums produced by Steve Marriott
A&M Records albums